Fly is a 1970 avant-garde short film directed by John Lennon and Yoko Ono. Filmed a year prior to the release of Ono's 1971 album of the same name, the short depicts a housefly crawling around on the body of a nude woman, actress Virginia Lust. By the end of the film, multiple flies can be seen on Lust's body. The film's visuals are accompanied by "Fly", a composition by Lennon and Ono that would later appear on Ono's album of the same name.

Production

Fly was conceived as a two-sentence premise initially titled Film No. 11: "About a fly going from the toe to head of a lying naked body, crawling very slowly. The whole film should take about an hour."

Soundtrack
The film's soundtrack was conceived in the Regency Hotel in New York on Christmas day in 1970. Lennon recorded the soundtrack on a multitrack Nagra audio recorder in three parts. The first "movement" features vocal improvisations by Ono, and the second features those vocals played back on the recorder while Lennon performs on a guitar. The third part of the soundtrack was recorded as follows: Lennon played guitar against the reversed playback of the second section of the soundtrack; this recording was then reversed (described by scholar Melissa Ragona as "a kind of double negative"), and played alongside another vocal solo by Ono. When the doubly-reversed recording finished, Ono continued performing vocally, and Lennon played a live radio.

The soundtrack would later be released as a track titled "Fly", appearing on Ono's 1971 album of the same name.

See also
 List of films featuring insects

References

Bibliography

External links
 

1970 films
Films directed by John Lennon
Films directed by Yoko Ono
1970s avant-garde and experimental films
Films about flies
1970s American films
1970s British films